Marcel Khalife (born 10 June 1950 in Amchit) is a  Lebanese musical composer, singer, and oud player.

Biography

In 1983, Paredon Records (later acquired by Smithsonian Folkways) released Promises of the Storm, a collection of protest songs and political ballads.

Tunisia

In July 2009, Khalife returned to Tunisia to perform on the stage of the Roman amphitheatre to a full house, as part of the 45th International Festival of Carthage. Speaking to the audience, Khalife opened the concert by stating:

Khalife later dedicated a song to the "revolutionary leader Che Guevara".

Ana Yousef, ya Abi case
Three times (1996, 1999 and 2003), he faced criminal prosecution for his song I am Joseph, O Father, written by the Palestinian poet Mahmoud Darwish.

Education 
Khalifé studied the oud at the Beirut National Conservatory of Music and graduated in 1971.

Professional life 
After graduating from the Beirut National Conservatory of Music in 1971, Khalife taught the art of oud playing there until 1975. Between 1972 and 1975, he taught music at public universities and several private music institutions in Lebanon while at the same touring the MENA region, Europe, and the United States to perform.

He formed in 1972 a musical group in Amchit to revive his village's musical heritage, and it performed for the first time in Lebanon. He formed in 1976 Al Mayadine Ensemble, which toured Arabic-speaking countries, Europe, the United States, Canada, South America, Australia, and Japan.

Personal life

His eldest son, Juilliard School graduate Rami Khalife, is a pianist and composer. In October 2011, the Qatar Philharmonic Orchestra, under the conductorship of James Gaffigan, premiered Khalife's 'Chaos', for orchestra and piano, with Khalife at the helm as a soloist. In February 2013, Rami Khalife's Arab Spring-inspired 'Requiem' was premiered, within the same program as Marcel Khalife's suite "Oriental".

Works

Books
In 1982, he wrote a six-part Anthology of Studying the Oud.

Performances
2005.11.14:  Lincoln Theatre (Washington, D.C.) USA
2004.01.12:  Kennedy Center Washington DC USA
2008.10.10:  De Roma Borgerhout, Antwerp, Belgium
2011.03.13:  Al-Bustan Concert Series, Philadelphia, PA, USA
2014.11.15:  Al-Bustan Concert Series, Philadelphia, PA, USA
2016.12.18:  Day for Night Festival, Houston, TX, USA
2018.05.25   Institut des cultures arabes et méditerranéennes,Geneva, Switzerland

Films
Marcel Khalife has composed soundtracks for films, documentaries and fictions, produced by Maroun Baghdadi, Oussama Mohammed, Sophi Sayhf Eddin and Samir Zikra. His music is also featured in the documentary Occupied Minds produced by Jamal Dajani and David Michaelis. His music featured in the documentary film Sons of Eilaboun by Hisham Zreiq.

Talks

Marcel Khalife gave a talk on 12 March 2013, at the American University of Sharjah about his latest CD, The Fall of the Moon, and his longing towards the late Mahmoud Darwish. He also spoke about prospects of publishing his autobiography in two volumes.

Discography
Below the discography of Marcel Khalife.

Studio albums
 Promises of the Storm (1976)
 At the Border (1980)
 Ahmad Al Arabi (1984)
 Dreamy Sunrise (1985)
 Ode to a Homeland (1990)
 Arabic Coffeepot (1995)
 Voyageur (1998)
 Jadal (2002)
 The Bridge (2002)
 Summer Night's Dream (2003)
 Promises of the Storm (2003)
 Caress (2004)
 Peace Be with You (2006)
 Taqasim (2006)
 Sharq (2007)
 Andulusia of Love (2016)

Singles
 Mounadiloun (Strugglers)
 Oummi (Mother)

Live albums
 Dance (1995)
 Marcel Khalife: Magic Carpet (1998)
 Concerto Al Andalus (2002)

References

English
 Marcel Khalife Discusses the New and the Old in Arabic Music in a Leading Literary Supplement: The Rationalization of Arabic Music, Translated and edited by Elie Chalala, Al Jadid magazine, Vol. 1, no. 1 (November 1995)
 Trial of famous Lebanese singer to begin: Marcel Khalifa Faces Three Years in Prison
 Music as a Mission: Marcel Khalife strums the heartbeat of the Arab world
 Lebanese singer banned in Tunisia
 Biography
 Interview with Marcel Khalife

French
  Marcel Khalifé: Voyageur..., Pierre Dupouey, mardi 10 février 2004
 Marcel Khalife poursuivi en justice: entre versets et sonnets, Taïeb Chadi
 Visages, Dalia Chams
 Biographie

External links

 
 UNESCO artist for peace
 Rawafed interview/Marcel Khalife

1950 births
Living people
20th-century Lebanese male singers
Lebanese oud players
Lebanese songwriters
21st-century Lebanese male singers
People from Amsheet
Lebanese Maronites